Yaraganalu also known as Yeraganalu is a village located in Karnataka, India. It belongs to the Hassan district.

Administration
The village is administered according to Panchayati Raj Act and Constitution of India which appoints Sarpanch as the Head of the village.

Population
According to the 2011 Indian census, the village consists of 174 families, of which 311 people are male and 323 are females.

Literacy
The village has a male literacy of 82.41 percent whereas female literacy rate is 67.43 percent according to the 2011 census.

References

Villages in Hassan district